Eternal is the fourth studio album by Florida death metal band Malevolent Creation. It was released on May 23, 1995 via Pavement Music. It is the first album without Brett Hoffmann.

Track listing

Personnel
 Dave Culross - Drums
 Jason Blachowicz - Bass/Vocals
 Phil Fasciana - Rhythm guitar
 Jon Rubin - Lead guitar

Malevolent Creation albums
1995 albums